Galloping Goose may refer to:

 Galloping Goose Regional Trail, bicycling and pedestrian trail in British Columbia, Canada
 Galloping Goose Motorcycle Club, America's first backpatch motorcycle club 
 Galloping Goose (railcar), a railcar, or "motor", as officially designated by Rio Grande Southern